The International Lesbian, Gay, Bisexual, Trans and Intersex Association (ILGA) is an organization which is committed to advancing human rights to all people, disregarding gender identity, sex characteristics and expression. ILGA participates in a multitude of agendas within the United Nations, such as creating visibility for LGBTI issues by conducting advocacy and outreach at the Human Rights Council, working with members to help their government improve LGBTI rights, ensuring LGBTI members are not forgotten in international law, and advocating for LBTI women’s issues at the Commission on the Status of Women.

History

The International Lesbian and Gay Association was founded in 1978 by activists from  United Kingdom, Northern Ireland, Ireland, Australia, the United States, and elsewhere. Finding it difficult to repeal the criminalization of homosexuality based on the common law tradition, the activists adopted a human rights based framing and focused on international courts, especially the European Court of Human Rights as it was easier to access. ILGA was involved in the Dudgeon v. United Kingdom (1981) and Norris v. Ireland (1988) cases that led to the repeal of laws criminalizing homosexuality in Northern Ireland and the Republic of Ireland. At the same time, it worked on cases related to unequal ages of consent, military service, transgender rights, asylum and housing rights, but these did not lead to a successful outcome.

ILGA was formerly known as International Lesbian and Gay Association, it adopted its current title in 2008. ILGA has grown to include 1,600 organizations from over 150 countries to fight for equal rights for lesbian, gay, bisexual, trans and intersex people.

The Coventry conference also called upon Amnesty International (AI) to take up the issue of persecution of lesbians and gays. After a 13-year campaign AI made the human rights of lesbians and gays part of its mandate in 1991 and, following the Brazilian Resolution, now advocates for LGBT rights on the international level.

ILGA obtained consultative status at the United Nations Economic and Social Council (ECOSOC) in mid-1993. Statements were made in the name of ILGA in the 1993 and 1994 sessions of the United Nations Sub-Commission on Prevention of Discrimination and Protection of Minorities and in the 1994 session of the United Nations Commission on Human Rights. ILGA's NGO status was suspended in September 1994 due to the group's perceived ties with pro-pedophilia organizations such as the North American Man/Boy Love Association. In 1994, these groups were expelled from the organization, and in June 2011, the ECOSOC granted consultative status to ILGA after a 29 to 14 vote, despite the strong opposition from African and Islamic countries. Consultative status gives the ILGA the ability to attend and speak at UN meetings and participate in Human Rights Council proceedings.

ILGA was involved in getting the World Health Organization to drop homosexuality from its list of illnesses.

Conferences
According to its constitution, ILGA has a world conference in which all of its member organisations can attend. The world conference normally sets the time and place for the next conference. However, the Executive Board has used its power under the constitution to set an alternative venue, in the event the venue originally set becomes unviable, as was the case in 2008, when the originally chosen venue of Quebec had to be abandoned due to difficulties encountered by the local organizing committee in raising the necessary funds and the conference had to be held in Vienna instead. The 2010 ILGA world conference took place in São Paulo, Brazil, the 2012 Conference took place in Stockholm, and the 2014 Conference took place in Mexico City.

Protests often made the conferences that the organization held more dramatic and having more negative attention then would've been wanted. A problem encountered was financial in nature which recently came to a head when an ILGA conference actually had to be postponed because of lack of funding. In 2022, ILGA held its first world conference since the beginning of the COVID-19 pandemic in Long Beach, California.

International Intersex Forum 

With a move to include intersex people in its remit, ILGA and ILGA-Europe have sponsored the only international gathering of intersex activists and organisations. The International Intersex Forum has taken place annually since 2011.

The third forum was held in Malta with 34 people representing 30 organisations "from all continents". The closing statement affirmed the existence of intersex people, reaffirmed "the principles of the First and Second International Intersex Fora and extend the demands aiming to end discrimination against intersex people and to ensure the right of bodily integrity, physical autonomy and self-determination". For the first time, participants made a statement on birth registrations, in addition to other human rights issues.

Funding 
ILGA's main source of income are donations from governments, organizations, private foundations, amongst the contribution of individuals. In 2020, the total income of ILGA amounted to 2,213,268 CHF.

Reports

State-Sponsored Homophobia
In 2011, ILGA released its State-Sponsored Homophobia Report and map that brings to light 75 countries that still criminalize same-sex relationships between two consenting adults. These countries are mainly in Africa and in Asia.

In 2016, ILGA released an updated version of the State-Sponsored Homophobia Report. The Report found that "same-sex sexual acts" are illegal in 72 countries. These countries are 37% of the States in the United Nations. Of these 72 countries, 33 are in Africa, 23 are in Asia, 11 are in the Americas, and six are in Oceania.

Historian Samuel Huneke criticized ILGA maps for showing most Western and non-Western countries in different colors, stating that while "This division probably make sense to the casual observer... queer scholars and activists have noted that it also has colonial overtones".

Global Attitudes Survey
In 2016, ILGA published its 2016 Global Attitudes Survey on LGBTI People. The principal subject surveyed was attitudes about "sexual orientation."

See also

 European Lesbian* Conference
 International Lesbian Information Service (ILIS)
 International Lesbian, Gay, Bisexual, Transgender & Intersex Law Association
 Intersex human rights
 LGBT social movements

Notes

Further reading

 Johansson, Warren & Percy, William A. Outing: Shattering the Conspiracy of Silence.  Harrington Park Press, 1994. pp. 192–193.

External links
 

 
International LGBT political advocacy groups
Organisations based in Brussels
Organizations established in 1978
1978 establishments in England